Elisabeth Isaksson is a Swedish glaciologist and geologist who has researched polar climate history on the basis of ice cores. She has also studied snow and ice pollution on the Norwegian island of Svalbard and has participated in award-winning European projects on Antarctic climate change.

Education
Isaksson graduated in geoscience at Umeå University in 1986. She went on to gain an Fil. Lic. from Stockholm University and an M.Sc. from the University of Maine in 1991. With a thesis on Climate records from shallow firn cores, Dronning Maud Land, Antarctica, she was awarded a Ph.D. from Stockholm University in 1994.

Career
Dr.Isaksson was a research assistant on Antarctic projects at Stockholm University (1988–1995), before becoming a glaciologist at the Norwegian Polar Institute in February 1995, a position she maintains today as head of the Geology and Geophysics department. Since 2001, she has worked on ice-core records from Lomonsovfonna on Svalbard, contributing to a number of papers on climate change over the past 800 years.

Thanks to changes in attitudes towards the acceptance of women in the field since the 1990s, Isaksson has been able to work as a glaciologist for over 25 years. While working on her doctorate under Wibjörn Karlén, she undertook research on Kebnekaise, Sweden's highest mountain. At the Norwegian Polar Institute, she has contributed to research on holocene climate changes in the Antarctic from ice and marine sediment core, nuclear fallout over Norwegian territories, and collaborative work with the United States on climate variability in East Antarctica. Isaksson has been a key participant in the European EPICA Antarctic climate project which received the Descartes Prize in 2007.

Personal life
In 1990, Isaksson married the American glaciologist Jack Kohler from Philadelphia who is also employed by the Norwegian Polar Institute. They have two children. Their home is in Tromsø in the far north of Norway.

References

External links
 
 

21st-century Swedish geologists
21st-century Swedish women scientists
Antarctic scientists
Women Antarctic scientists
20th-century Swedish geologists
Swedish women geologists
Swedish glaciologists
Living people
Female polar explorers
Swedish explorers
Umeå University alumni
Stockholm University alumni
University of Maine alumni
Swedish expatriates in Norway
Year of birth missing (living people)
Women glaciologists
20th-century Swedish women scientists